Svein Sand  is a Norwegian handball player.

He made his debut on the Norwegian national team in 1960, 
and played 18 matches for the national team between 1960 and 1965. He participated at the 1961 World Men's Handball Championship.

References

Year of birth missing (living people)
Living people
Norwegian male handball players